The Jalisco Stadium is a football stadium located in Guadalajara, Mexico. It is the third-largest Mexican football stadium behind Estadio Azteca and Estadio Olímpico Universitario with a capacity of 56,713 spectators.

History 

Estadio Jalisco was the home ground of Guadalajara, one of the oldest football teams in Mexico, until 2010. It remains the home stadium of Atlas in the Liga MX and Club Universidad de Guadalajara in the Liga de Expansión MX. Several football preliminary matches took place for the 1968 Summer Olympics.

The stadium hosted games in two separate FIFA World Cups in 1970 and 1986. During both of those tournaments the Estadio Jalisco was the temporary home of the Brazilian national team and today remains a liaison between the people of Guadalajara and the Brazilian national team. The stadium is centrally located in the heart of the neighbourhood called Colonia Independencia, and is in front of the Plaza de Toros Nuevo Progreso ("New Progress" Bullring).

The stadium also hosted eight games in the 1999 FIFA Confederations Cup, including the third-place game.

After 50 years, Guadalajara moved to the Estadio Omnilife in 2010.

1970 FIFA World Cup
The stadium hosted eight matches in the 1970 FIFA World Cup, including six group matches, a quarterfinal, and the semifinal in which Brazil defeated Uruguay 3-1.

1986 FIFA World Cup
The stadium hosted six matches in the 1986 FIFA World Cup, including all three group matches involving Brazil, a round-of-16 match, a quarterfinal, and a semifinal. Brazil played in every single game the stadium hosted except one of the semifinals where it was hoped Brazil would play as well but it didn't happen as the  French men's national football team defeated Brazil on penalties in the quarterfinals.

Renovations 
On January 31, 2017, Clubes Unidos de Jalisco announced a renovation project to replace seating at the Jalisco, to replace the deteriorating roof, remodeling dressing rooms and adding a large 360 degree screen above the field. The 360 screen was set to debut during the match vs Tigres UANL on September 8, 2017; however, it was determined that the match would be suspended due to the screen being installed merely 8 meters above the field, thus making it impossible for regular gameplay.

See also 
 List of football stadiums in Mexico

References

External links 
 Official Stadium site
 fussballtempel.net - photos of the Jalisco
 World Stadiums Article

Sports venues in Guadalajara, Jalisco
Atlas F.C.
1970 FIFA World Cup stadiums
1986 FIFA World Cup stadiums
1999 FIFA Confederations Cup stadiums
Jalisco
Venues of the 1968 Summer Olympics
Olympic football venues
College association football venues in Mexico
1960 establishments in Mexico
Sports venues completed in 1960